(January 3, 1758 – May 13, 1814) was a Japanese daimyō of the Edo period, who ruled the Tokushima Domain.

Family
 Father: Hachisuka Shigeyoshi
 Mother: Tsutehime
 Wife: Toshihime (1762-1786)
 Concubines:
 Takano-dono
 Tsuyo no Kata
 Children:
 Hachisuka Akimaru
 Norihime married Okubo Tadazane by Takano-dono
 Norijiro by Takano-dono
 Tsunahime married Matsudaira Sadanaga by Tsuyo no Kata
 Hachisuka Narimasa by Tsuyo no Kata
 Hachisuka Akiyuki by Tsuyo no Kata
 Mitsuhime married Matsudaira Mitsuosa by Tsuyo no Kata
 Yoshihime married Kuki Takanori by Tsuyo no Kata

Ancestry

References

1758 births
1814 deaths
Daimyo
Hachisuka clan